Cultivating New Frontiers in Agriculture (CNFA) is a non-profit international development organization based in Washington, DC. CNFA's mission is to increase and sustain rural incomes in less developed areas of the world by assisting farmers and rural entrepreneurs. CNFA works in Eastern Europe, the Caucasus, South and Central Asia, Africa, the Near and Middle East and the Caribbean to improve agricultural economies by''':

 Strengthening market linkages
 Building input supply networks
 Promoting enterprise growth and development
 Enabling agribusiness financing
 Improving processing and marketing

CNFA receives funding from a variety of donors, including USAID, USDA, the Millennium Challenge Corporation, and the Rockefeller Foundation.

History
CNFA was founded in 1985 as the Citizens Network for Foreign Affairs.

The Citizens Network's National Policy Roundtable Programs was focused on expanding grassroots dialogue on the U.S. stake in global economic growth to include women, minorities, farmers, agribusinesses and small- and medium- size companies.

In 1993, CNFA began the Food Systems Restructuring Program, using USAID funds to bring about agricultural reform in the NIS (Post-Soviet states), and sent out its first international volunteers to Russia and the Ukraine.

Having shifted its focus from fostering dialogue to using public funds to promote international development, the Citizens Network for Foreign Affairs legally changed its name to CNFA in September 2007.

Current programs

CNFA is active in the following countries:
 Afghanistan
 Angola
 Azerbaijan
 Belarus
 Burkina Faso
 Ethiopia
 Georgia
 Ghana
 Haiti
 Kenya
 Malawi
 Mali
 Moldova
 Mozambique
 Niger
 Nigeria
 Pakistan
 Tanzania
 Tajikistan
 Uganda
 Uzbekistan

See also
 Farmer to Farmer

References

External links 

 Official website

Non-profit organizations based in Washington, D.C.
International development agencies